Painted Head is an album by folk artist Tim Hardin, recorded in England and released in 1972. It was Hardin's last release on Columbia Records.

Background
Hardin had moved to England in February, 1972 after the release of his album Bird on a Wire. While there he was undergoing methadone treatment for his heroin addiction. The sessions included British session musicians as well as guest Peter Frampton. The album sold poorly and his contract with Columbia was terminated.

There are no original songs on Painted Head. It was re-issued by BGO Records in 2007 on CD.

Reception 

In his review for Allmusic, music critic James Chrispell wrote "This is a much different album for Tim Hardin, but it is much better than most would have thought... While Painted Head isn't that great an album, it shows that Hardin was trying to reel in his excesses and give his career some much-needed discipline."

Track listing

Side one 
 "You Can't Judge a Book by the Cover" (Willie Dixon) – 4:12
 "Midnight Caller" (Pete Ham) – 3:09
 "Yankee Lady" (Jesse Winchester) – 4:27
 "Lonesome Valley" (Traditional) – 4:29
 "Sweet Lady" (Dino, Sambello, Sembello) – 3:47

Side two 
 "Do the Do" (Willie Dixon) – 4:20
 "Perfection" (Pete Ham) – 3:03
 "Till We Meet Again" (Neil Sheppard) – 3:13
 "I'll Be Home" (Randy Newman) – 5:43
 "Nobody Knows You When You're Down and Out" (Jimmy Cox) – 6:38

Personnel 
Tim Hardin – vocals, acoustic guitar, keyboards
Peter Frampton – electric guitar
Don Brooks – harmonica
Rebop Kwaku Baah – conga drums
Tony Carr – cowbell 
Alun Davies – acoustic guitar
Tristan Fry – vibraphone, background vocals
The Cissy Houston Singers – vocals on "Do The Do"
Liza Strike – background vocals
Bobbie Whittaker – vocals on "I'll Be Home"
Dennis Lopez – percussion, timbales
Tony Meehan – organ, piano, percussion, chimes, drums, vibraphone, string, horn, choir, woodwind arrangements
Rod Murfield – maracas
Larry Packer – fiddle
Alan Ross – guitar, mandolin
Jean Roussel – organ, piano, keyboards
Bruce Rowland – drums
Jeff Schwartz – pedal steel guitar
Neil Shepherd – piano, harmonium
Chris Stewart – bass
21st Century Singers – choir on "I'll Be Home"
David Katz - conductor
Technical
Geoff Emerick - recording engineer, remixing
Elliot Scheiner, James Green, Lehman Yates, Michael Stone - overdubs
Teresa Alfieri - cover design
Cliff Condak - cover artwork

References 

1972 albums
Tim Hardin albums
Columbia Records albums
Albums recorded at Apple Studios